Ivana Matović (Serbian Cyrillic: Ивана Матовић, born 11 September 1983) is a former Serbian female basketball player. She is 197 cm and plays center position. She also played for Vojvodina, Usk Blex, MKB Euroleasing Sopron, WBC Spartak Moscow, Lotos Gdynia, Fenerbahçe and again USK Praha.

She played 25 points, 15 rebounds and 6 assists per game in Euroleague'05 season and she played with 15.5 points 4.9 rebounds and 2.5 assists per game in Euroleague'09.

References

External links
Profile on fibaeurope.com
Profile on eurobasket.com

1983 births
Living people
Sportspeople from Šabac
Fenerbahçe women's basketball players
Centers (basketball)
Serbian women's basketball players
ŽKK Vojvodina players